Taikicetus is a genus of basal thalassothere baleen whale from the Middle Miocene of Japan.

Classification
Phylogenetic analysis recovers Taikicetus as a basal thalassothere more primitive than Cetotheriidae and Balaenopteroidea.

Description
Taikicetus is distinguished from other closely related thalassotheres by an anteriorly swollen short zygomatic process (length vs width of the zygomatic process; high triangular coronoid process; and weak angular process, which does not reach as far posterior as the mandibular condyle; outline of suture between maxillae and palatines forming a posteriorly pointing V-shape, convex lateral edge of supraoccipital convex in dorsal view, tip of postglenoid process in lateral view pointing ventrally, and outline of postglenoid process distinctly wider than high in anterior or posterior view.

References

Miocene cetaceans
Prehistoric cetacean genera
Baleen whales
Fossils of Japan